Witt – Live in der Berliner Philharmonie is a live album by German rock musician Joachim Witt that was recorded in 2002.

Track listing video 

Bataillon d'Amour
Jetzt und ehedem
Das geht tief
Kyrie eleison! (Der Mönch)
In tiefer Nacht
Der Sturm
Seenot
Und... ich lauf
Über den Ozean
Wintermärz
Hey – Hey (Was für ein Morgen!)
Dann warst du da!
Liebe und Zorn
Die Flucht
Die Flut
Stay?
Goldener Reiter
Medley -Kosmetik (Ich bin das Glück dieser Erde)
Tri Tra Trullala (Herbergsvater)

Bonus videos 

Die Flut
Bataillon d'Amour
Und... ich lauf
Das geht tief
Stay?

Joachim Witt albums
2002 live albums
2002 video albums
Live video albums